Leopoldsburg/Beverlo Airfield  was originally a military airfield on the grounds of a big military base. It had long permitted civilian use, hosting an aeroclub and several private aircraft owners. The military no longer having any use for it, it was turned over to civilian usage in 2017. It is located near Leopoldsburg, Limburg, Belgium. It is sometimes known by the name of its operator, the aeroclub Sanicole. It yearly hosts a reputed airshow, and also a European meeting/fly-in of builders/owners of experimental and/or historic aeroplanes.

See also
List of airports in Belgium

References

External links 
 Airport record for Aeroclub Sanicole VZW at Landings.com
 Website of the Sanicole Airshow
 Sanicole aeroclub in local language

Airports in Limburg (Belgium)